The 2013 IIHF U18 World Championship was the 15th IIHF World U18 Championship and was hosted in Sochi, Russia. This was also a test event for the facilities to be used in the 2014 Winter Olympics. It began on 18 April 2013 with the gold medal game played on 28 April 2013.

Canada won its third under-18 championship by defeating the four time defending champion Americans 3–2. The host Russians lost to Finland 2–1 in the bronze medal game. MVP Connor McDavid set Canadian records for goals and points in the tournament.

Top Division

Format
A new format was implemented. The four best ranked teams from the preliminary round advanced to the quarterfinals, while the last placed teams played a relegation round in a best of three format to determine the relegated team.  Additionally the practice of playing ranking games (fifth place through eighth place) was abandoned.

Venues
Bolshoy Ice Dome
Shayba Arena

Officials
The IIHF selected 12 referees and 10 linesmen to work the 2013 IIHF U18 World Championship.
They were the following:

Referees
  Tobias Björk
  Marcus Brill
  Igor Dremelj
  Peter Gebei
  Jacob Grumsen
  René Hradil
  Andreas Koch
  Jari Leppäalho
  Timothy Mayer
  Róbert Mullner
  Steve Papp
  Evgeniy Romasko

Linesmen
  Vasili Kaliada
  Kenji Kosaka
  Joep Leermakers
  Fraser McIntyre
  Eduard Metalnikov
  Pasi Nieminen
  Henrik Pihlblad
  Mariusz Smura
  Rudolf Tosenovjan
  Matt Traub

Preliminary round

Group A

All times are local. (Moscow Time – UTC+4)

Group B

All times are local. (Moscow Time – UTC+4)

Relegation round 
The last-placed teams play a best-of-three series.

Latvia is relegated to 2014 Division I A; the third game was not played because the result of the relegation series had been decided.

Knockout stage

Quarterfinals

Semifinals

Bronze medal game

Gold medal game

Scoring leaders
List shows the top ten skaters sorted by points, then goals.

GP = Games played; G = Goals; A = Assists; Pts = Points; +/− = Plus-minus; PIM = Penalties in minutesSource: IIHF.com

Leading goaltenders
Only the top five goaltenders, based on save percentage, who have played 40% of their team's minutes are included in this list.
TOI = Time On Ice (minutes:seconds); SA = Shots against; GA = Goals against; GAA = Goals against average; Sv% = Save percentage; SO = ShutoutsSource: IIHF.com

Tournament Awards
Best players selected by the directorate:
Best Goalkeeper: 
Best Defenseman: 
Best Forward: 
Source: IIHF.com

Final standings

Division I

Division I A
The Division I A tournament was played in Asiago, Italy, from 7 to 13 April 2013. Danish goalie Georg Sørensen scored a goal against France, joining Anton Khudobin as the only goaltenders ever to accomplish this feat in an IIHF event.

Division I B
The Division I B tournament was played in Tychy, Poland, from 14 to 20 April 2013.

Division II

Division II A
The Division II A tournament was played in Tallinn, Estonia, from 31 March to 6 April 2013.

Division II B
The Division II B tournament was played in Belgrade, Serbia, from 9 to 15 March 2013.

Division III

Division III A
The Division III A tournament was played in Taipei City, Taiwan, from 11 to 16 March 2013.

Division III B
The Division III B tournament was played in İzmit, Turkey, from 7 to 10 February 2013.

References

External links
IIHF website

 
IIHF World U18 Championships
World
2013
IIHF World U18 Championships
April 2013 sports events in Europe
Ice Hockey